Damian Kowalczyk (born 3 August 1995 in Jawor) is a Polish football player who plays as a forward.

Career

Club
He made his debut for Zagłębie in a 4–1 victory to Wisła Kraków on 8 December 2012.

References

External links 
 
 

Polish footballers
Poland youth international footballers
Zagłębie Lubin players
Pogoń Szczecin players
Chrobry Głogów players
Ruch Chorzów players
Ekstraklasa players
III liga players
II liga players
I liga players
Living people
1995 births
People from Jawor
Association football midfielders